Barry Stephen Troyna (6 September 1951 – 9 February 1996) was a British sociologist of education and anti-racist activist who taught at the University of Warwick. He is known for his writings on racism and racial inequality in education.

Biography
Troyna was born in Hackney, North London, England. He attended Tottenham Grammar School, followed by Nottingham College, from which he received his Bachelor of Education degree. He then taught briefly at Dukeries Comprehensive School before enrolling at the University of Leicester, where he earned his M.Phil. in 1978. From 1981 to 1985, he worked with John Rex at the University of Warwick's Centre for Research in Ethnic Relations as a research officer. He was a reader at Sunderland Polytechnic from 1986 to 1988. In October 1995, three months before he died, the University of Warwick awarded him a personal professorship. He died in Coventry, England on 9 February 1996, after fighting cancer for almost two years. At the time of his death, he was editor-in-chief of the British Educational Research Journal.

References

1951 births
1996 deaths
English sociologists
Sociologists of education
British education writers
British anti-racism activists
Academics of the University of Warwick
Deaths from cancer in England
People from the London Borough of Hackney
Alumni of the University of Leicester
People educated at Tottenham Grammar School
Academic journal editors
Academics of the University of Sunderland